CWL may stand for:

Businesses and organizations 
 California Woman Lawyers, a California bar association for female lawyers
 Cardiff Airport, Wales (by IATA code)
 Catholic Women's League
 Centralne Warsztaty Lotnicze, a Polish aircraft manufacturer
 Compagnie des Wagons-Lits, French on-train service company
 Company of Watermen and Lightermen, a guild of the city of London

Gaming 
 Call of Duty World League, esports tournament

Science and technology
 Centre wavelength, for a bandpass filter
 Common Workflow Language, for computation in the sciences